The 2017 Chicago Fire season was the club's 22nd year of existence, as well as their 20th season in Major League Soccer, the top-flight of American soccer.  The Fire reached the playoffs for the first time since 2012, losing in the knockout round.

Current squad 
As of September 27, 2017. Source: Chicago Fire official roster

{| class="wikitable" style="text-align:center; font-size:90%; width:90%;"
|-
! style="background:#C41E3A; color:white; text-align:center;"| No.
! style="background:#C41E3A; color:white; text-align:center;"| Name
! style="background:#C41E3A; color:white; text-align:center;"| Nationality
! style="background:#C41E3A; color:white; text-align:center;"| Position
! style="background:#C41E3A; color:white; text-align:center;"| Date of Birth (Age)
! style="background:#C41E3A; color:white; text-align:center;"| Previous Club
! style="background:#C41E3A; color:white; text-align:center;"| Player Notes
|-
! colspan="7" style="background:#c2ddff; color:black; text-align:center;"| Goalkeepers
|-
| 1
| Jorge Bava
| 
| GK
| 
|align=left|  Atlético Bucaramanga
| International
|-
| 28
| Matt Lampson
| 
| GK
| 
|align=left|  Columbus Crew
|
|-
| 30
| Stefan Cleveland
| 
| GK
| 
|align=left|  University of Louisville
| Loaned Out
|-
| 45
| Richard Sánchez
| 
| GK
| 
|align=left|  Tigres UANL
|
|-
! colspan="7" style="background:#c2ddff; color:black; text-align:center;"| Defenders
|-
| 3
| Brandon Vincent
| 
| D
| 
|align=left|  Stanford Cardinal
|
|-
| 4
| Johan Kappelhof
| 
| D
| 
|align=left|  FC Groningen
| International
|-
| 5
| Michael Harrington
| 
| D
| 
|align=left|  Colorado Rapids
|
|-
| 16
| Jonathan Campbell
| 
| D
| 
|align=left|  North Carolina Tar Heels
|
|-
| 22
| Patrick Doody
| 
| D
| 
|align=left|  Indiana Hoosiers
| Homegrown
|-
| 25
| Jorge Luis Corrales
| 
| D
| 
|align=left|  Tulsa Roughnecks
| Loaned Out
|-
| 26
| Christian Dean
| 
| D
| 
|align=left|  Vancouver Whitecaps
|
|-
| 33
| Matej Dekovic
| 
| D
| 
|align=left|  University of North Carolina Charlotte
| International,Loaned out
|-
| 66
| João Meira
| 
| D/M
| 
|align=left|  Belenenses
| International
|-
! colspan="7" style="background:#c2ddff; color:black; text-align:center;"| Midfielders
|-
| 2
| Matt Polster
| 
| M
| 
|align=left|  SIU Edwardsville Cougars
|
|-
| 6
| Dax McCarty
| 
| M
| 
|align=left|  New York Red Bulls
|
|-
| 7
| John Goossens
| 
| M
| 
|align=left|  FC Voluntari
| International,On injured list
|-
| 12
| Arturo Álvarez
| 
| M
| 
|align=left|  Videoton FC
|
|-
| 13
| Brandt Bronico
| 
| M
| 
|align=left|  University of North Carolina Charlotte
|Loaned out
|-
| 14
| Djordje Mihailovic
| 
| M
| 
|align=left|  Chicago Fire Academy
| Homegrown
|-
| 15
| Joey Calistri
| 
| M
| 
|align=left|  Northwestern Wildcats
| Homegrown,Loaned out
|-
| 17
| Collin Fernandez
| /
| M
| 
|align=left|  Chicago Fire Academy
| Homegrown,Loaned out
|-
| 18
| Drew Conner
| 
| M
| 
|align=left|  Wisconsin Badgers
| Homegrown
|-
| 19
| Juninho
| 
| M
| 
|align=left|  Club Tijuana
| Loaned in
|-
| 20
| Daniel Johnson
| 
| M
| 
|align=left|  University of Louisville
|
|-
| 31
| Bastian Schweinsteiger
| 
| M
| 
|align=left|  Manchester United
|Designated Player,International
|-
! colspan="7" style="background:#c2ddff; color:black; text-align:center;"| Forwards
|-
| 8
| Michael de Leeuw
| 
| F
| 
|align=left|  FC Groningen
| International
|-
|9
| Luis Solignac
| 
| F
| 
|align=left|  Colorado Rapids
| International
|-
| 10
| David Arshakyan
| 
| F
| 
|align=left|  FK Trakai
| International
|-
| 11
| David Accam
| 
| F/M
| 
|align=left|  Helsingborgs IF
| Designated Player
|-
| 23
| Nemanja Nikolić
| 
| F
| 
|align=left|  Legia Warsaw
| Designated Player,International
|-
|}

Player movement

In 
Per Major League Soccer and club policies terms of the deals do not get disclosed.

Out 

 Players selected in 2017 MLS SuperDraft, but ultimately not signed: forward Guillermo Delgado (27th overall, second round, from University of Delaware).
 Trialists released in the preseason: midfielder Miguel Alvarado, defender Chad Barson, defender Drew Beckie, forward Juan Pablo Caffa, goalkeeper Chris Konopka, goalkeeper Mihajlo Miskovic (Chicago Fire Academy), defender Boyd Okwuonu defender Taylor Peay, and defender Ryan Taylor.
 Trialists who joined the team during the season but were not signed: forward Maximilian Beister, defender Justin Bilyeu, midfielder Alessandro Diamanti, and defender Michael Schulze,

Loans 
Per Major League Soccer and club policies terms of the deals do not get disclosed.

In

Out

Technical staff

Standings

Eastern Conference table

Overall table

Results summary

Match results

Preseason 
Kickoff times are in CST (UTC-06)

Major League Soccer 

Kickoff times are in CDT (UTC-05), unless posted otherwise

MLS Cup Playoffs 

Kickoff times are in CDT (UTC-05)

U.S. Open Cup 

Kickoff times are in CDT (UTC-05)

Squad statistics

Games Played

Goalkeeping Statistics

Goalscoring and Assisting Record

Updated to match played on October 22, 2017.Source: MLSsoccer.com statistics – 2017 Chicago Fire

Disciplinary record

Updated to match played on October 22, 2017.Source: MLSsoccer.com statistics – 2017 Chicago Fire

Awards

MLS End of Year Awards

MLS Player of the Month

MLS Player of the Week

MLS Team of the Week

MLS Goal of the Week

MLS All-Star Game

MLS Homegrown Game

National team call-ups 
Arturo Álvarez
Friendly vs Canada, October 8 (Started, played 89 minutes)

David Accam
Friendly vs Mexico, June 28 (Subbed on, played 31 minutes)
Friendly vs United States, July 1 (Started, played 45 minutes)

Dax McCarty
Friendly vs Serbia, January 29 (Did not play)
Friendly vs Jamaica, February 3 (Started, played 63 minutes)
World Cup Qualifier vs Honduras, March 24 (Did not play)
World Cup Qualifier at Panama, March 28 (Did not play)
Friendly vs Venezuela, June 3 (Did not play)
World Cup Qualifier vs Trinidad and Tobago, June 8 (Did not play)
World Cup Qualifier at Mexico, June 11 (Did not play)
Friendly vs Ghana (Started, played 90 minutes)
2017 CONCACAF Gold Cup
vs Panama, July 8 (Started, played 90 minutes)
vs Martinique, July 12 (Subbed on, played four minutes)
vs Nicaragua, July 15 (Started, played 90 minutes)
vs El Salvador, July 19 (Did not play)
vs Costa Rica, July 22 (Subbed on, played five minutes)
vs Jamaica, July 26 (Subbed on, played one minute)
World Cup Qualifier vs Costa Rica, September 1 (Did not play)
World Cup Qualifier at Honduras, September 5 (Did not play)
World Cup Qualifier vs Panama, October 6 (Subbed on, played 33 minutes)
World Cup Qualifier at Trinidad and Tobago, October 10 (Did not play)

Matt Polster
2017 CONCACAF Gold Cup Preliminary Roster (Was not selected)

Kits

Primary kit 
According to the league's bi-annual rotation of kits the primary kit carried over from the previous season.  It was originally unveiled on January 25, 2016.  The jersey features an all-red design with the return of the iconic white bar across the chest.  The Chicago city flag embossed on the lower front for the jersey's jock tag.

Secondary kit 
The new secondary kit has been unveiled by the club on February 6, 2017.  It's gray color is based on the same tone as the center of the club's logo. The jersey has the high V-neck collar and features blue numbers, names and trim, with red accents and "EST. 1997" on jock tag.  The back neck tape has crossed axes, as the primary kit.  Six-pointed stars from Chicago city flag are placed on the sleeve trim as well as socks.

Draft pick trades 
Picks acquired:
 2017 MLS SuperDraft natural first round pick (No. 11), General Allocation Money, Targeted Allocation Money, discovery rights to an unnamed player, and the #2 ranking in the MLS Allocation Order from Philadelphia Union in exchange for the #1 ranking in the MLS Allocation Order. Philadelphia used the #1 allocation ranking to acquire midfielder Alejandro Bedoya.
 2017 MLS SuperDraft No. 26 and 27 overall picks (second round) from Toronto FC in exchange for $75,000 in Targeted Allocation Money.
 2019 MLS SuperDraft natural third round pick from D.C. United in exchange for forward Kennedy Igboananike.
 2019 MLS SuperDraft natural third round pick from Minnesota United in exchange for the first spot in the MLS Waiver Order.

Picks traded:
 2017 MLS SuperDraft natural first round pick (No. 3) to New York City FC in exchange for $250,000 in General Allocation Money.
 2017 MLS SuperDraft natural second round pick to Columbus Crew SC in exchange for the Discovery Priority on Khaly Thiam.  Pursuant to the trade agreement, if Thiam started in 12 or more 2016 MLS regular season games, or if his loan was extended or successfully converted into a transfer following the 2016 season, Columbus would receive General Allocation Money instead of the SuperDraft pick.  As Thiam started in 12 or more regular season games, Fire retained the pick.  This second round natural selection was traded to Minnesota United FC, together with the No. 3 ranking in the MLS Allocation Order, and general allocation money in exchange for the No. 2 ranking in the MLS Allocation Order. Chicago Fire used its allocation ranking to acquire midfielder Juninho (No. 1 spot holder Atlanta United FC passed on the player).
 2018 MLS SuperDraft conditional pick to Portland Timbers in exchange for the No. 6 ranking in the MLS Allocation Order, which it then used to sign goalkeeper Richard Sánchez (all previous holders opted not to sign him); if he starts at least five games, Portland receives the Fire's natural second round pick- if he doesn't, they receive the natural third round pick

References

External links 
 

Chicago Fire FC seasons
Chicago Fire Soccer Club
Chicago Fire Soccer Club
Chicago Fire